Events from the year 1519 in India.

Events
 Nasiruddin Nasrat Shah become ruler of the Sultanate of Bengal following his father's (Alauddin Husain Shah) death

Births
 Hindal Mirza Mughal prince and youngest son of Emperor Babur is born (dies 1551)

Deaths
 Alauddin Husain Shah, sultan of Bengal

See also

 Timeline of Indian history

References

 
India